The Lower Waterford Congregational Church is a historic church at 63 Lower Waterford Road in Waterford, Vermont.  Built in 1859, it is a prominent local example of Greek Revival architecture.  The building was listed on the National Register of Historic Places in 2019.

Description and history
The Lower Waterford Congregational Church stands prominently in the small village of Lower Waterford, at the junction of Lower Waterford Road and Maple Street.  It is a two-story rectangular wood-frame structure set on a stone foundation, with white clapboard siding and a gabled roof.  A square tower rises from the northern end of the roof, topped by an octagonal spire.  The tower has two stages, each with a hipped roof and louvered openings on each side.  The front facade has two symmetrically placed entrances on either side of a tall window.  All three elements are capped by a shallow peaked lintel.  The building's corner boards are paneled, with an entablature extending along the sides.

The church was built in 1859 for a congregation established in 1798; it was that organization's third edifice, built on the site of the second, which was destroyed by fire in 1857.  It was built by Charles Richardson, owner of a local carriage shop and sometime bridge builder.  It was apparently designed to serve a broader array of community functions, and housed Waterford's annual town meetings until 1957.  It continues to serve both civic and religious functions, hosting historical society events and meetings of the town selectmen.

The National Register listing was the result of a process begun in 2017 by formation of a committee including a town selectman, a town librarian, the Waterford Historical Society and church leaders.

See also
National Register of Historic Places listings in Caledonia County, Vermont

References

Churches on the National Register of Historic Places in Vermont
Greek Revival architecture in Vermont
Churches completed in 1859
Buildings and structures in Waterford, Vermont
Churches in Caledonia County, Vermont
National Register of Historic Places in Caledonia County, Vermont